Dennis Burton may refer to:
 Dennis Burton (immunologist), British immunologist
 Dennis Burton (artist), Canadian artist